Phinizy Swamp Nature Park is a  nature park in Augusta, Georgia. The park contains wetlands and woodlands and has a campus for water research and environmental education, which includes a visitor center. It has many bald cypresses draped in Spanish moss and forests of loblolly trees. Birds commonly found at Phinizy Swamp include: red-shouldered hawks, great blue herons, sora, wood ducks and bald eagles. Sometimes the park yields rarities for Georgia, including black-bellied whistling ducks, and a cave swallow, in 2004. Other wildlife commonly found in the park include frogs and toads; snakes, including water moccasin, pigmy rattlesnake, and copperhead; beavers and muskrat; turtles; and dragonflies. Fishing and hunting are not permitted within the park. Phinizy Swamp Nature Park is managed by Phinizy Center for Water Sciences.

Gallery

References 

Geography of Augusta, Georgia
Parks in Georgia (U.S. state)
Protected areas of Richmond County, Georgia
Tourist attractions in Augusta, Georgia
Nature centers in Georgia (U.S. state)